Seo Hyun-chul (born 19 May 1965) is a South Korean theatre, film and television actor. He is known for his supporting roles in various TV series and films. His better known works are: 2013 medical drama series Good Doctor, 2017 TV series Revolutionary Love, 2019 thriller series Woman of 9.9 Billion, and 2021 action-comedy film Mission: Possible. In 2022, he is appearing in Thirty-Nine.

Career
Seo debuted in 1994 ln play Hwang Gu-do. Since then he has appeared in about 110 stage and musical plays. He made his TV debut in 2010 series Cinderella's Stepsister, whereas his film debut was in the film Finding Mr. Destiny in the same year.

Seo appeared on talk show Radio Star thrice in year 2015, 2017 and 2019 in  episodes 426, 513 and 648 respectively.

In 2021 he appeared in tvN's apocalyptic thriller Happiness along with his wife Jung Jae-eun.

In 2022 Seo was cast in JTBC TV series Thirty-Nine as father of one of the main leads.

Personal life
Seo married actress Jung Jae-eun after 2 years of dating at the age of 45.

Filmography

Films

Television series

Television show

Theater

References

External links
 Seo Hyun-chul official website
 
 Seo Hyun-chul on Play DB
 Seo Hyun-chul on Daum 

21st-century South Korean male actors
South Korean male television actors
South Korean male film actors
Living people
1965 births
South Korean stage actors